Kul Marz may refer to:

Kul Marz Olya
Kul Marz Sofla